Alex McRobbie is a New Zealand rugby union player who plays for  in Super Rugby. His playing position is lock. He was named in the Moana Pasifika squad for the 2022 Super Rugby Pacific season. He also represented  in the 2021 Bunnings NPC.

References

External links
itsrugby.co.uk profile

New Zealand rugby union players
Living people
Rugby union locks
Counties Manukau rugby union players
Moana Pasifika players
Year of birth missing (living people)
Rugby union players from the Auckland Region